The Coleman River is a river on the Cape York Peninsula in Far North Queensland, Australia.

Course and features
Formed by the confluence of the Little Coleman River and Big Coleman River, the headwaters of the river rise under Lapunya Mount near The Lagoons in the Great Dividing Range and initially flows south. From source to mouth, the Coleman River is joined by six tributaries including the King River and the Lukin River, and descends  over its  course.

The catchment includes the Edward River sub-basin, and area occupies . It contains the towns of Bamboo, Edward River, Glen Garland, Strath-Haven, Strathgordon, Strathmay and Yarraden, which includes the abandoned locale of Ebagoola.

A total of 46 species of fish have been found in the river, including: the sailfin glassfish, barred grunter, shovel-nosed catfish, bigeye trevelly, fly-specked hardyhead, golden gudgeon, pPennyfish, mouth almighty, barramundi, oxeye herring, rainbowfish and seven-spot archerfish.

History

The Olkola people inhabited the basin for thousands of years.

Yir Yiront is an Australian Aboriginal language. Its traditional language region is in Western Cape York within the local government areas of  Aboriginal Shire of Kowanyama and Shire of Cook, in the catchments of the  Coleman River and Mitchell River. Following the removal of Aboriginal people from their traditional lands, it is also spoken in Pormpuraaw and Kowanyama.

The river was named by the explorer William Hann in 1872.

At the turn of the 20th century, a gold rush led to conflict with colonial Australians, resulting in several massacres of the Olkola. Between 2011 and 2014, the Olkola people negotiated a handback of traditionally held lands, part of which became Olkola National Park.

See also

References

Rivers of Far North Queensland
Gulf of Carpentaria